The Muslim Students Society of Nigeria (MSSN) was cofounded in 1954 by Abdurrahaman Sahid, Babs Fafunwa, Tajudeen Aromashodun, Lateef Adegbite in Lagos.

Adegbite, its first national president, became known for his defense of Sharia law.

Following the Chibok schoolgirl kidnapping, the President of the Muslim Students Society of Nigeria, Malam Abdulazeez Folayemi, called on Muslims to fast and pray "in order to seek Allah's intervention in this precarious time."

Presidents 
Here is list of presidents of Muslim Students Society of Nigeria:

 Razaq Deremi Abubakre (1974-1975)

References

External links 

1954 establishments in Nigeria
Islamic organizations based in Nigeria
Islamic organizations established in 1954
Student organizations established in 1954
Student religious organizations